Driopea is a genus of beetles in the family Cerambycidae, containing the following species:

subgenus Driopea
 Driopea clytina Pascoe, 1858
 Driopea schmidi Breuning, 1971
 Driopea setosa Aurivillius, 1922

subgenus Fasciatodriopea
 Driopea chinensis Breuning, 1967
 Driopea griseobasalis Breuning, 1968
 Driopea nigrofasciata Pic, 1926

subgenus Inermodriopea
 Driopea atronotata Pic, 1929
 Driopea cyrtomera Aurivillius, 1922
 Driopea delta Aurivillius, 1922
 Driopea griseonotata Breuning, 1957
 Driopea inermis Pascoe, 1864
 Driopea nigromaculata Pic, 1926

subgenus Luteodriopea
 Driopea luteolineata Pic, 1926

subgenus Trichodriopea
 Driopea excavatipennis Breuning, 1980

References

 
Acanthocinini